Nations to Flames is the fourth studio album by American post-metal band A Storm of Light.  It was released by Southern Lord on 17 September 2013.  The album has been noted for its shift from the post-rock of its predecessor towards a sound that more prominently highlights the band's industrial and doom influences.

Style
Nations to Flames has been described as amongst the most aggressive and fast-paced albums in A Storm of Light's discography. Guitarist and vocalist Josh Graham acknowledged that this has been part of a larger shift for the band:

Graham's approach to vocals on Nations to Flames drew comparisons to Killing Joke's Jaz Coleman and departed from the clean singing characteristic of his past approach.  Graham confirmed that his approach was developed when the band played songs off of Nations to Flames durings its tour with Converge prior to entering the recording studio.  During that tour, Graham said that he "realized that what we needed was more aggression and somewhat more atonal vocals," which he described as "more akin to Motörhead than Killing Joke".

Concept
The concept underlying the album is, according to Graham, a tale of "one possible future of human failure [involving] the collapse of society due to overpopulation and pollution".  He further detailed the concept as a story humanity "realiz[ing] too late that the importance of their government, their nationalism, and their religions meant nothing in relation to the damage we are inflicting on our planet."  The concept extends to the album cover art, which portrays what Graham describes as "a small surviving group of revolutionaries [who] are biding time until their own demise. The body and the flag represent humanity, and are being ironically sacrificed to the earth...more fire, more smoke, more pollution. They know now that their revolution/realization happened too late, and that the earth will soon be on its own."

Further to the concept, the CD insert references Margaret Atwood's 2009 short fiction, "Time Capsule Found On the Dead Planet", as suggested reading.  This piece was written by Atwood as part of the 10:10 global warming mitigation campaign.

Reception

Nations to Flames generally received favourable reviews, with most critics commenting upon the stylistic departure from the band's previous album.  Ray Van Horn Jr. wrote for Blabbermouth that the album was "reflective more of industrial and splatterpunk", yet the album "is still joined at the hip by those core values of punched-up doom and explorative embellishments".  Natalie Zina Walschots praised the album in Exclaim! as the band's "best release to date", and also suggested that "the melancholic and atmospheric" post-rock elements had been "burned away by the mechanical heat of industrial and crushed by the relentless weight of doom". Describing the album as "the soundtrack to our damnation", Matt Hinch described the album for About.com as a "lush, fulfilling and diverse affair".  However, David Maine was more critical of the album in Popmatters, suggesting that "listener fatigue" diminishes the album concept, with "any kind of considered commentary on the society in which we live is lost amid the layers of distortion and double-kick drumming".

Track listing

Personnel

Band
 Domenic Seita - bass, backing vocals
 Billy Graves - drums, percussion
 Josh Graham - guitar, keyboards, vocals

Guest Musicians
 Kim Thayil - guitar on "The Fire Sermon", "Omen", and "The Year Is One"
 Will Lindsay - guitar on "Apostles of Hatred", "Omen", "Lifeless", "Disintegrate", and "Soothsayer"

Production
 Travis Kammeyer - recording
 Matt Bayles - mixing
 Brad Boatright - mastering
 Josh Graham and A Storm of Light - production

Art
 Niko Tavernise - photography
 Josh Graham -  - photography
 Josh Graham - layout and design

References 

2013 albums
A Storm of Light albums
Industrial albums by American artists
Southern Lord Records albums
Doom metal albums by American artists